The Singles is a compilation album by English electronic music duo Goldfrapp, released on 3 February 2012 by Mute Records and Parlophone. The album features singles from the duo's first five studio albums, as well as two previously unreleased tracks, "Yellow Halo" and "Melancholy Sky".

Background and release
Following the duo's departure from EMI in August 2010, it was confirmed in April 2011 that Goldfrapp had begun work on their sixth studio album. In December 2011, it was announced that a 14-track retrospective compilation titled The Singles would be released on 6 February 2012 by Mute Records and Parlophone, including the biggest singles from their five studio albums, as well as two brand-new songs, "Melancholy Sky" and "Yellow Halo". "Melancholy Sky" was released on 3 January 2012 as the compilation's lead single, while a video for "Yellow Halo" was directed by Lisa Gunning and entirely shot on Gunning's iPhone in South America.

Critical reception
{{Album ratings
| MC = 85/100
| rev1 = AllMusic
| rev1score = 
| rev2 = Daily Express
| rev2score = 4/5
| rev3 = Digital Spy
| rev3score = 
| rev4 = DIY
| rev4score = 9/10
| rev5 = Drowned in Sound
| rev5score = 8/10
| rev6 = entertainment.ie
| rev6score = 
| rev7 = musicOMH
| rev7score = 
| rev8 = Pitchfork| rev8score = 8.4/10
| rev9 = PopMatters| rev9score = 9/10
| rev10 = Slant Magazine| rev10score = 
}}The Singles received critical acclaim from music critics. At Metacritic, which assigns a normalised rating out of 100 to reviews from mainstream publications, the album received an average score of 85, based on 14 reviews. AllMusic editor Heather Phares commented that the album "shows that [the duo's] craftsmanship and good taste may have been their most defining quality", while noting that "[t]heir style-hopping sounds less like searching for what will stick and more like the product of two restlessly creative artists who had the talent to do just about anything they wanted and tried a little of everything." Pitchforks Matthew Perpetua wrote that Goldfrapp "have spent the past decade moving back and forth between icy electro-glam and atmospheric balladry, delivering these extremes in tonally consistent albums that dare to alienate listeners who favor one style over the other." Matt James of PopMatters commented, "Over the course of five albums, Goldfrapp have proved themselves one of the most imaginative, artistic and entertaining bands of this new century", concluding that the compilation "offers an intriguing introduction to one of Britain's premier pop art bands." Drowned in Sound's David Edwards opined that "the most striking thing from their singles compilation is that within this, they actually managed to craft some rather excellent pieces of pop orientated electronica", adding that on The Singles, Goldfrapp are "exactly how they wanted the world to see them: sleek, intelligent, flirtatious and deliciously off their tits."

Martyn Young of DIY described the compilation as "a triumph of compellingly brilliant classy pop". Jaime Gill of BBC Music raved, "Fourteen songs that veer between the perfect and the merely outstanding, The Singles is proof that Goldfrapp have been the most versatile and most consistently, glitteringly brilliant pop band of our new millennium." In a review for the Daily Express, Simon Gage found that the duo "has built up quite a body of work as displayed on this gorgeous little collection", writing that "[w]hile their albums are well-worth discovering and hugely well-received, the singles showcase some excellent work". Lewis Corner of Digital Spy stated, "For over a decade the duo have been writing consistently fantastic pop songs—and here is the proof." Elaine Buckley of entertainment.ie commended the duo for their "wonderful electric stylings" and wrote that "the songs of The Singles are still as impressive as ever." Slant Magazines Matthew Cole viewed the compilation as "a terrific showcase for Goldfrapp's versatility, though on the crucial point of whether or not their midtempo and ambient numbers are as essential as their dance hits, it's not entirely convincing." John Murphy of musicOMH expressed, "Whereas each of Goldfrapp's albums occasionally had the odd filler track that stopped them from being gilt-edged classics, here we get all the meat and none of the fat [...] there's so much pop sensibility crammed in here that each track sounds almost impossibly fresh."

Track listing

Personnel
Credits adapted from the liner notes of The Singles''.

 Goldfrapp – arrangement, engineering, production ; mixing ; art direction
 Jonathan Allen – string engineering ; string engineering 
 Alexander Bălănescu – violin 
 Jim Barr – additional engineering 
 David Bascombe – vocal arrangement ; mixing 
 Nick Batt – synthesiser ; additional programming ; additional engineering ; additional synthesiser ; bass synthesiser ; additional drum programming ; additional production and beat 
 Steve Claydon – synthesiser 
 Jon Collyer – additional programming 
 John Dent – mastering 
 Alex Dromgoole – assistant engineering 
 Bruno Ellingham – additional engineering ; additional programming 
 Tom Elmhirst – mixing 
 David Emery – assistant engineering 
 Steve Evans – acoustic guitar 
 Flood – guitar ; mixing ; keyboards ; additional production and mixing ; acoustic guitar, sequencer 
 Greg Freeman – drum recording 
 Pascal Gabriel – additional production 
 Tim Goldsworthy – additional programming 
 Stuart Gordon – viola, violin 
 Matty Green – mixing assistant 
 Lee Groves – additional mix programming 
 Tony Hoffer – overdub engineering ; mixing 
 Nick Ingman – string orchestration and conduction 
 Ted Jensen – mastering 
 Charlie Jones – bass 
 Alex Lee – guitar 
 Mark Linkous – Casio 
 David Lord – additional engineering 
 Ged Lynch – drums 
 Mat Maitland – collage
 Stephen Marcussen – mastering 
 Mike Marsh – mastering 
 Stephen Marshall – assistant string engineering 
 Justin Meldal-Johnsen – bass 
 Metro Voices – choir 
 Daniel Miller – synthesiser 
 Bill Mims – overdub engineering ; mixing assistant 
 Yoad Nevo – additional programming 
 Jenny O'Grady – choir master 
 Rowen Oliver – additional engineering ; drums, percussion ; additional drum programming 
 Tim Oliver – additional engineering 
 Steve Orchard – string engineering and submixing 
 Tony Orrell – drums 
 Daisy Palmer – drums ; percussion 
 John Parish – drums 
 Ewan Pearson – additional programming 
 Patrick Phillips – mixing assistant 
 Dave Power – additional drums 
 Damon Reece – drums ; percussion 
 Tim Roe – assistant engineering 
 Davide Rossi – violin 
 Andy Savoun – additional programming, mixing assistant 
 Sonia Slany – violin 
 Mark 'Spike' Stent – mixing ; original mixing 
 Leo Taylor – drums 
 Adrian Utley – guitar ; bass 
 Ruth Wall – harp samples 
 Chris Weston – additional programming 
 Denny Weston Jr. – drums 
 Jeremy Wheatley – additional production and mixing ; single version mixing

Charts

Release history

References

2012 compilation albums
Albums produced by Flood (producer)
Albums produced by Pascal Gabriel
Astralwerks compilation albums
Goldfrapp compilation albums
Mute Records compilation albums
Parlophone compilation albums